New Princeton is an unincorporated community in Harney County, in the U.S. state of Oregon. The South Fork Malheur River begins near Round Mountain, southeast of New Princeton.

The Princeton rural post office was established in 1910 or about 1912, depending on the source consulted. When an upgrade of Route 78 bypassed the original community, it was re-located to New Princeton.

Climate
According to the Köppen Climate Classification system, New Princeton has a semi-arid climate, abbreviated "BSk" on climate maps.

References

Works cited
McArthur, Lewis A., and McArthur, Lewis L. (2003) [1928]. Oregon Geographic Names, 7th ed. Portland: Oregon Historical Society Press. .

External links
Oregon Hometown Locator

Unincorporated communities in Harney County, Oregon
1910 establishments in Oregon
Populated places established in 1910
Unincorporated communities in Oregon